This is an alphabetical list of the names of all ships that have been in service with the French Navy.  Names are traditionally re-used over the years, and have been carried by more than one ship.

List of ships

A
 Achéron
 Achille
 Aconit
 Admirable
 Africain
 Africaine
 Aigle
 Alexandre
 Algérien
 Algésiras
 Amarante
 Amazone
 Ambitieux
 America
 Amiral Charner
 Amphitrite
 Andromaque
 Annibal
 Apollon
 Aquilon
 Aquitaine
 Arabe
 Aréthuse
 Argonaute
 Ariane
 Armide
 Arromanches
 Artémis
 Artémise
 Astrée
 Astrolabe
 Atalante
 Atlas
 Audacieux
 Auguste

B
 Bison
 Borda
 Boudeuse
 Bougainville
 Bouvet

C
 Capricieuse
 Casabianca
 Cassard
 Cassiopée
 Chacal
 Champlain
 Colbert
 Courbet

D 
 D'Entrecasteaux
 D'Estienne d'Orves
 De Grasse
 Dumont d'Urville
 Dupérré
 Dupetit-Thouars
 Dupleix
 Dupuy de Lôme
 Duquesne
 Durance

E
 Églantine
 Élan
 Épée
 Espadon
 Estérel
 Étoile

F
 Forbin
 Foudre
 Fougueuse
 Francis Garnier

G
 Gapeau
 Garonne
 Gazelle
 Georges Leygues
 Glaive
 Glorieuse
 Gracieuse
 Guénon
 Guépard GuépratteH
 Hache Hallebarde Henri PoincaréI
 Indomptable InflexibleJ
 Jacques Cartier Jaguar Jauréguiberry Jean Bart Jean de Vienne Jeanne d'Arc Jules VerneK
 KersaintL
 La Fayette La Galissonnière La Grandière La Motte-Picquet Lapérouse Laplace Latouche-Tréville Léopard Lion Loire Luberon Lynx LyreM
 Maillé-Brézé Marne Massue Méduse Mercure Meuse Mistral Monge Montcalm Moqueuse MutinN
 NormandO
 Orage Orion OuraganP
 Panthère Pégase Persévérante Pluton Poseïdon PrimauguetR
 Rapière Railleuse Reddition Redoutable Richelieu RieuseS
 Sabre Siroco Somme Styx SurcoufT
 Tapageuse Tenace Téméraire Terrible Tigre Tonnant Tourville TriomphantV
 Var Vauquelin Victor Schoelcher Vigilant Vulcain''

See also
List of Royal Navy ship names

Notes

References
 

 
Navy ships